Essen (Latin: Assindia) is the central and, after Dortmund, second-largest city of the Ruhr, the largest urban area in Germany. Its population of  makes it the fourth-largest city of North Rhine-Westphalia after Cologne, Düsseldorf and Dortmund, as well as the ninth-largest city of Germany. Essen lies in the larger Rhine-Ruhr Metropolitan Region and is part of the cultural area of Rhineland. Because of its central location in the Ruhr, Essen is often regarded as the Ruhr's "secret capital". Two rivers flow through the city: in the north, the Emscher, the Ruhr area's central river, and in the south, the Ruhr River, which is dammed in Essen to form the Lake Baldeney (Baldeneysee) and Lake Kettwig (Kettwiger See) reservoirs. The central and northern boroughs of Essen historically belong to the Low German (Westphalian) language area, and the south of the city to the Low Franconian (Bergish) area (closely related to Dutch).

Essen is seat to several of the region's authorities, as well as to eight of the 100 largest publicly held German corporations by revenue, including three DAX-listed corporations. Essen is often considered the energy capital of Germany with E.ON and RWE, Germany's largest energy providers, both headquartered in the city. Essen is also known for its impact on the arts through the respected Folkwang University of the Arts, its Zollverein School of Management and Design, and the Red Dot industrial product design award. In early 2003, the universities of Essen and the nearby city of Duisburg (both established in 1972) were merged into the University of Duisburg-Essen with campuses in both cities and a university hospital in Essen. In 1958, Essen was chosen to serve as the seat to a Roman Catholic diocese (often referred to as Ruhrbistum or diocese of the Ruhr).

Founded around 845, Essen remained a small town within the sphere of influence of an important ecclesiastical principality (Essen Abbey) until the onset of industrialization. The city then—especially through the Krupp family iron works—became one of Germany's most important coal and steel centers. Essen, until the 1970s, attracted workers from all over the country; it was the fifth-largest city in Germany between 1929 and 1988, peaking at over 730,000 inhabitants in 1962. Following the region-wide decline of heavy industries in the last decades of the 20th century, the city has seen the development of a strong tertiary sector of the economy. The most notable witness of this Strukturwandel (structural change) is the Zollverein Coal Mine Industrial Complex, which had once been the largest of its kind in Europe. Ultimately closed in 1993, both the coking plant and the mine have been inscribed in the list of UNESCO World Heritage Sites since 2001.

Notable accomplishments of the city in recent years include the title of European Capital of Culture on behalf of the whole Ruhr area in 2010 and the selection as the European Green Capital for 2017.

Geography

General 

Essen is located in the centre of the Ruhr area, one of the largest urban areas in Europe (see also: megalopolis), comprising eleven independent cities and four districts with some 5.3 million inhabitants.

The Ruhr forms the  reservoir in the boroughs of Fischlaken, Kupferdreh, Heisingen and Werden. The lake, a popular recreational area, dates from 1931 to 1933, when some thousands of unemployed coal miners dredged it with primitive tools. Generally, large areas south of the River Ruhr (including the suburbs of Schuir and Kettwig) are quite green and are often quoted as examples of rural structures in the otherwise relatively densely populated central Ruhr area. According to the Federal Statistical Office of Germany, Essen with 9.2% of its area covered by recreational green is the greenest city in North Rhine-Westphalia and the third-greenest city in Germany. The city has been shortlisted for the title of European Green Capital two consecutive times, for 2016 and 2017, winning for 2017. The city was singled out for its exemplary practices in protecting and enhancing nature and biodiversity and efforts to reduce water consumption. Essen participates in a variety of networks and initiatives to reduce greenhouse gas emissions and to improve the city's resilience in the face of climate change.

City districts 
Essen comprises fifty boroughs which in turn are grouped into nine suburban districts (called Stadtbezirke) often named after the most important boroughs. Each Stadtbezirk is assigned a Roman numeral and has a local body of nineteen members with limited authority. Most of the boroughs were originally independent municipalities but were gradually annexed from 1901 to 1975. This long-lasting process of annexation has led to a strong identification of the population with "their" boroughs or districts and to a rare peculiarity: The borough of Kettwig, located south of the Ruhr River, and which was not annexed until 1975, has its own area code and remains part of the Archdiocese of Cologne, whereas all other boroughs of Essen and some neighbouring cities constitute the Diocese of Essen.

Climate 
Essen has a typical oceanic climate (Köppen: Cfb) with cool winters and warm summers (different of Berlin or Stuttgart). Without large mountains and the presence of inland seas, it ends up extending a predominantly marine climate is found in Essen, usually a little more extreme and drier in other continents in such geographical location.

History

Origin of the name 
In German-speaking countries, the name of the city Essen often causes confusion as to its origins, because it has the same form as the German infinitive of the verb for "eating" (written as lowercase essen), and/or the German noun for food (which is always capitalized as Essen, adding to the confusion). Although scholars still dispute the interpretation of the name, there remain a few noteworthy interpretations. The oldest known form of the city's name is Astnide, which changed to Essen by way of forms such as Astnidum, Assinde, Essendia and Esnede. The name Astnide may have referred either to a region where many ash trees were found or to a region in the East (of the Frankish Empire). The Old High German word for fireplace, Esse, is also commonly mentioned due to the industrial history of the city, but is highly unlikely since the old forms of the city name originate from times before industrialization.

Early history 
The oldest archaeological find, the Vogelheimer Klinge, dates back to 280,000 – 250,000 BC. Other artifacts from the Stone Age have also been found, although these are not overly numerous. Land utilization was very high—especially due to mining activities during the Industrial Age—and any more major finds, especially from the Mesolithic era, are not expected. Finds from 3,000 BC and onwards are far more common, the most important one being a Megalithic tomb found in 1937. Simply called Steinkiste (Chest of Stone), it is referred to as "Essen's earliest preserved example of architecture".

Essen was part of the settlement areas of several Germanic peoples (Chatti, Bructeri, Marsi), although a clear distinction among these groupings is difficult.

The  castle in the south of Essen dates back to the eighth century, the nearby  to the ninth century.

Recent research into Ptolemy's Geographia has identified the polis or oppidum Navalia as Essen.

Eighth–twelfth centuries 

Around 845, Saint Altfrid (around 800–874), the later Bishop of Hildesheim, founded an abbey for women (coenobium Astnide) in the centre of present-day Essen. The first abbess was Altfrid's relative Gerswit (see also: Essen Abbey). In 799, Saint Liudger had already founded Benedictine Werden Abbey on its own grounds a few kilometers south. The region was sparsely populated with only a few smallholdings and an old and probably abandoned castle. Whereas Werden Abbey sought to support Liudger's missionary work in the Harz region (Helmstedt/Halberstadt), Essen Abbey was meant to care for women of the higher Saxon nobility. This abbey was not an abbey in the ordinary sense, but rather intended as a residence and educational institution for the daughters and widows of the higher nobility; led by an abbess, the members other than the abbess herself were not obliged to take vows of chastity.

Around 852, construction of the collegiate church of the abbey began, to be completed in 870. A major fire in 946 heavily damaged both the church and the settlement. The church was rebuilt, expanded considerably, and is the foundation of the present Essen Cathedral.

The first documented mention of Essen dates back to 898, when Zwentibold, King of Lotharingia, willed territory on the western bank of the River Rhine to the abbey. Another document, describing the foundation of the abbey and allegedly dating back to 870, is now considered an 11th-century forgery.

In 971, Mathilde II, granddaughter of Emperor Otto I, took charge of the abbey. She was to become the most important of all abbesses in the history of Essen. She reigned for over 40 years, and endowed the abbey's treasury with invaluable objects such as the oldest preserved seven branched candelabrum, and the Golden Madonna of Essen, the oldest known sculpture of the Virgin Mary in the western world. Mathilde was succeeded by other women related to the Ottonian emperors: Sophia, daughter of Otto II and sister of Otto III, and Teophanu, granddaughter of Otto II. It was under the reign of Teophanu that Essen, which had been called a city since 1003, received the right to hold markets in 1041. Ten years later, Teophanu had the eastern part of Essen Abbey constructed. Its crypt contains the tombs of St. Altfrid, Mathilde II, and Teophanu herself.

13th–17th centuries 

In 1216, the abbey, which had only been an important landowner until then, gained the status of a princely residence when Emperor Frederick II called abbess Elisabeth I Reichsfürstin (Princess of the Empire) in an official letter. In 1244, 28 years later, Essen received its town charter and seal when Konrad von Hochstaden, the Archbishop of Cologne, marched into the city and erected a city wall together with the population. This proved a temporary emancipation of the population of the city from the princess-abbesses, but this lasted only until 1290. That year, King Rudolph I restored the princess-abbesses to full sovereignty over the city, much to the dismay of the population of the growing city, who called for self-administration and imperial immediacy. The title free imperial city was finally granted by Emperor Charles IV in 1377. However, in 1372, Charles had paradoxically endorsed Rudolph I's 1290 decision and hence left both the abbey and the city in imperial favour. Disputes between the city and the abbey about supremacy over the region remained common until the abbey's dissolution in 1803. Many lawsuits were filed at the Reichskammergericht, one of them lasting almost 200 years. The final decision of the court in 1670 was that the city had to be "duly obedient in dos and don'ts" to the abbesses but could maintain its old rights—a decision that did not really solve any of the problems.

In 1563, the city council, with its self-conception as the only legitimate ruler of Essen, introduced the Protestant Reformation. The Catholic abbey had no troops to counter this development.

Thirty Years' War 
During the Thirty Years' War, the Protestant city and the Catholic abbey opposed each other. In 1623, princess-abbess Maria Clara von Spaur, Pflaum und Valör, managed to direct Catholic Spaniards against the city in order to initiate a Counter-Reformation. In 1624, a "re-Catholicization" law was enacted, and churchgoing was strictly controlled. In 1628, the city council filed against this at the Reichskammergericht. Maria had to flee to Cologne when the Dutch stormed the city in 1629. She returned in the summer of 1631 following the Bavarians under Gottfried Heinrich Graf zu Pappenheim, only to leave again in September. She died 1644 in Cologne.

The war proved a severe blow to the city, with frequent arrests, kidnapping and rape. Even after the Peace of Westphalia from 1648, troops remained in the city until 9 September 1650.

Industrialisation 

The first historic evidence of the important mining tradition of Essen date back to the 14th century, when the princess-abbess was granted mining rights. The first silver mine opened in 1354, but the indisputably more important coal was not mentioned until 1371, and coal mining only began in 1450.

At the end of the 16th century, many coal mines had opened in Essen, and the city earned a name as a centre of the weapons industry. Around 1570, gunsmiths made high profits and in 1620, they produced 14,000 rifles and pistols a year. The city became increasingly important strategically.

Resident in Essen since the 16th century, the Krupp family dynasty and Essen shaped each other. In 1811, Friedrich Krupp founded Germany's first cast-steel factory in Essen and laid the cornerstone for what was to be the largest enterprise in Europe for a couple of decades. The weapon factories in Essen became so important that a sign facing the main railway station welcomed visitors Hitler and Mussolini to the "Armory of the Reich" in 1937. The Krupp Works also were the main reason for the large population growth beginning in the mid-19th century. Essen reached a population of 100,000 in 1896. Other industrialists, such as Friedrich Grillo, who in 1892 donated the Grillo-Theater to the city, also played a major role in the shaping of the city and the Ruhr area in the late 19th and early 20th century.

World War I and occupation 

Riots broke out in February 1917 following a breakdown in the supply of flour. There were then strikes in the Krupp factory.

On 11 January 1923 the Occupation of the Ruhr was carried out by the invasion of French and Belgian troops into the Ruhr. The French Prime Minister, Raymond Poincaré, was convinced that Germany failed to comply the demands of the Treaty of Versailles. On the morning of 31 March 1923, the culmination of this French-German confrontation occurred when a small French military command, occupied the Krupp car hall to seize several vehicles. This event caused 13 deaths and 28 injured. The occupation of the Ruhr ended in summer 1925.

Nazism, World War II 
On the night of Kristallnacht on 10 November 1938, the synagogue was sacked, but remained through the whole war in the exterior almost intact. The Steele synagogue was completely destroyed.

During the Nazi era, tens of thousands of slave laborers were forced to work in 350 Essen forced labour camps. Here, they did mining work and worked for companies like Krupp and Siemens. Alfried Krupp was convicted in the Krupp trial at Nuremberg for his role in this but was pardoned by the US in 1951.

As a major industrial centre, Essen was a target for allied bombing, the Royal Air Force (RAF) dropping a total of 36,429 long tons of bombs on the city. Over 270 air raids were launched against the city, destroying 90% of the centre and 60% of the suburbs. On 5 March 1943 Essen was subjected to one of the heaviest air-raids of the war. 461 people were killed, 1,593 injured and a further 50,000 residents of Essen were made homeless. On 13 December 1944 three British airmen were lynched.

The Krupp decoy site (German: Kruppsche Nachtscheinanlage) was built in Velbert to divert Allied airstrikes from the actual production site of the arms factory in Essen.

The Allied ground advance into Germany reached Essen in April 1945. The US 507th Parachute Infantry Regiment of the 17th Airborne Division, acting as regular infantry and not in a parachute role, entered the city unopposed and captured it on 10 April 1945.

After the successful invasion of Germany by the allies, Essen was assigned to the British Zone of Occupation. On 8 March 1946, a German Army Officer and a civilian were hanged for the lynching of three British Airmen in December 1944.

Twenty-first century 

Although weaponry is no longer produced in Essen, old industrial enterprises such as ThyssenKrupp and RWE remain large employers in the city. Foundations such as the Alfried Krupp von Bohlen und Halbach-Stiftung still promote the well-being of the city, for example by supporting a hospital and donating €55,000,000 for a new building for the Museum Folkwang, one of the Ruhr area's major art museums.

Politics

Historical development 
The administration of Essen had for a long time been in the hands of the princess-abbesses as heads of the Imperial Abbey of Essen. However, from the 14th century onwards, the city council increasingly grew in importance. In 1335, it started choosing two burgomasters, one of whom was placed in charge of the treasury. In 1377, Essen was granted imperial immediacy but had to abandon this privilege later on. Between the early 15th and 20th centuries, the political system of Essen underwent several changes, most importantly the introduction of the Protestant Reformation in 1563, the annexation of 1802 by Prussia, and the subsequent secularization of the principality in 1803. The territory was made part of the Prussian Province of Jülich-Cleves-Berg from 1815 to 1822, after which it became part of the Prussian Rhine Province until its dissolution in 1946.

During the German Revolution of 1918–19, Essen was the home of the Essen Tendency (Essener Richtung) within the Communist Workers' Party of Germany. In 1922 they founded the Communist Workers' International. Essen became one of the centres of resistance to Social Democracy and the Freikorps alike.

During the Nazi era (1933–1945), mayors were installed by the Nazi Party. After World War II, the military government of the British occupation zone installed a new mayor and a municipal constitution modeled on that of British cities. Later, the city council was again elected by the population. The mayor was elected by the council as its head and as the city's main representative. The administration was led by a full-time Oberstadtdirektor. In 1999, the position of Oberstadtdirektor was abolished in North Rhine-Westphalia and the mayor became both main representative and administrative head. In addition, the population now elects the mayor directly.

Mayor 
The current Mayor of Essen is Thomas Kufen of the Christian Democratic Union (CDU), who was elected in 2015 and re-elected in 2020.

The most recent mayoral election was held on 13 September 2020, and the results were as follows:

! colspan=2| Candidate
! Party
! Votes
! %
|-
| bgcolor=|
| align=left| Thomas Kufen
| align=left| Christian Democratic Union
| 115,415
| 54.3
|-
| bgcolor=|
| align=left| Oliver Kern
| align=left| Social Democratic Party
| 43,093
| 20.3
|-
| bgcolor=|
| align=left| Mehrdad Mostofizadeh
| align=left| Alliance 90/The Greens
| 25,924
| 12.2
|-
| bgcolor=|
| align=left| Harald Parussel
| align=left| Alternative for Germany
| 12,695
| 6.0
|-
| bgcolor=|
| align=left| Daniel Kerekeš
| align=left| The Left
| 5,414
| 2.5
|-
| bgcolor=|
| align=left| Annie Maria Tarrach
| align=left| Die PARTEI
| 5,168
| 2.4
|-
| bgcolor=|
| align=left| Karlgeorg Raimund Krüger
| align=left| Free Democratic Party
| 4,200
| 2.0
|-
| bgcolor=|
| align=left| Peter Köster
| align=left| German Communist Party
| 546
| 0.3
|-
| bgcolor=|
| align=left| Detlef Albert Fergeé
| align=left| National Democratic Party
| 232
| 0.1
|-
! colspan=3| Valid votes
! 212,687
! 99.1
|-
! colspan=3| Invalid votes
! 1,861
! 0.9
|-
! colspan=3| Total
! 214,548
! 100.0
|-
! colspan=3| Electorate/voter turnout
! 446,384
! 48.1
|-
| colspan=5| Source: State Returning Officer
|}

City council 

The Essen city council governs the city alongside the Mayor. The most recent city council election was held on 13 September 2020, and the results were as follows:

! colspan=2| Party
! Votes
! %
! +/-
! Seats
! +/-
|-
| bgcolor=|
| align=left| Christian Democratic Union (CDU)
| 73,206
| 34.4
|  3.0
| 30
|  2
|-
| bgcolor=|
| align=left| Social Democratic Party (SPD)
| 51,550
| 24.3
|  9.7
| 21
|  10
|-
| bgcolor=|
| align=left| Alliance 90/The Greens (Grüne)
| 39,569
| 18.6
|  7.4
| 16
|  6
|-
| bgcolor=|
| align=left| Alternative for Germany (AfD)
| 15,849
| 7.5
|  3.7
| 6
|  3
|-
| bgcolor=|
| align=left| The Left (Die Linke)
| 8,309
| 3.9
|  1.4
| 3
|  2
|-
| bgcolor=|
| align=left| Free Democratic Party (FDP)
| 6,476
| 3.0
|  0.2
| 3
| ±0
|-
|
| align=left| Essen Citizens' Alliance (EBB)
| 6,209
| 2.9
|  1.4
| 3
|  1
|-
| bgcolor=|
| align=left| Die PARTEI (PARTEI)
| 5,282
| 2.5
|  1.7
| 2
|  1
|-
| bgcolor=|
| align=left| Human Environment Animal Protection (Tierschutz)
| 4,396
| 2.1
| New
| 2
| New
|-
| colspan=7 bgcolor=lightgrey|
|-
|
| align=left| Social Liberal Alliance (SLB)
| 760
| 0.4
| New
| 0
| New
|-
| bgcolor=|
| align=left| German Communist Party (DKP)
| 463
| 0.2
|  0.1
| 0
| ±0
|-
| bgcolor=|
| align=left| Volt Germany (Volt)
| 357
| 0.2
| New
| 0
| New
|-
| bgcolor=|
| align=left| Pirate Party Germany (Piraten)
| 86
| 0.0
|  1.8
| 0
|  2
|-
! colspan=2| Valid votes
! 212,512
! 98.9
!
!
!
|-
! colspan=2| Invalid votes
! 2,327
! 1.1
!
!
!
|-
! colspan=2| Total
! 214,839
! 100.0
!
! 86
!  4
|-
! colspan=2| Electorate/voter turnout
! 446,384
! 48.1
!  2.8
!
!
|-
| colspan=7| Source: State Returning Officer
|}

Coat of arms 

The coat of arms of the city of Essen is a heraldic peculiarity. Granted in 1886, it is a so-called Allianzwappen (arms of alliance) and consists of two separate shields under a single crown. Most other coats of arms of cities use a mural crown instead of a heraldic crown. The crown, however, does not refer to the city of Essen itself, but instead to the secularized ecclesiastical principality of Essen under the reign of the princess-abbesses. The dexter (heraldically right) escutcheon shows the double-headed Imperial Eagle of the Holy Roman Empire, granted to the city in 1623. The sinister (heraldically left) escutcheon is one of the oldest emblems of Essen and shows a sword that people believed was used to behead the city's patron Saints Cosmas and Damian. People tend to connect the sword in the left shield with one found in the Cathedral Treasury. This sword, however, is much more recent. A slightly modified and more heraldically correct version of the coat of arms can be found on the roof of the Handelshof hotel near the main station.

Demographics

Essen has a population about 580,000. In 1960, the population reached its historical peak of over 720,000 (Essen was the fifth largest German city at that time) due to its booming industrial era of the Ruhr Area and West Germany (Wirtschaftswunder). Since 1970s, the population of Essen declined due to loss of jobs by coal and mining. Essen has a large migrant population, most of them are from Turkey, Syria and Poland.

International relations
The City of Monessen, Pennsylvania, situated along the Monongahela River, was named after the river and Essen.

Twin towns – sister cities

Essen is twinned with:

Changzhou, China (2015)
Grenoble, France (1974)
Nizhny Novgorod, Russia (1991)
Sunderland, England, United Kingdom (1949)
Tampere, Finland (1960)
Tel Aviv, Israel (1991)
Zabrze, Poland (2015)

Cooperation agreements
Essen cooperates with:
Kōriyama, Japan (2017)
Qingdao, China (2008)
Rivne, Ukraine (2022)
Ulaanbaatar, Mongolia (2012)

Industry and infrastructure

Economy 
Essen is home to several large companies, among them the ThyssenKrupp industrial conglomerate which is also registered in Duisburg and originates from a 1999 merger between Duisburg-based Thyssen AG and Essen-based Friedrich Krupp AG Hoesch-Krupp. The largest company registered only in Essen is Germany's second-largest electric utility RWE AG. Essen hosts parts of the corporate headquarters of Schenker AG, the logistics division of Deutsche Bahn. Other major companies include Germany's largest construction company Hochtief, as well as Aldi Nord, Evonik Industries, Karstadt, Medion AG and Deichmann, Europe's largest shoe retailer. The Coca-Cola Company had originally established their German headquarters in Essen (around 1930), where it remained until 2003, when it was moved to the capital Berlin. In light of the Energy transition in Germany, Germany's largest electric utility E.ON announced that, after restructuring and splitting off its conventional electricity generation division (coal, gas, atomic energy), it will move its headquarters to Essen in 2016, becoming a sole provider of renewable energy. The DAX-listed chemical distribution company Brenntag announced to move its headquarter to Essen at the end of 2017.

Fairs 

The city's exhibition centre, Messe Essen, hosts some 50 trade fairs each year. With around 530.000 visitors each year, Essen Motor Show is by far the largest event held there. It has been described as "the showcase event of the year for the tuning community" and as the German version of the annual SEMA auto show in Las Vegas. As contrasted with the Frankfurt Auto Show, the Essen show is smaller and is focused on car tuning and racing interests. Other important fairs open to consumers include SPIEL, the world's biggest consumer fair for tabletop gaming, and one of the leading fairs for equestrian sports, Equitana, held every two years. Important fairs restricted to professionals include "Security" (security and fire protection), IPM (gardening) and E-World (energy and water).

Media 
The Westdeutscher Rundfunk has a studio in Essen, which is responsible for the central Ruhr area. Each day, it produces a 30-minute regional evening news magazine (called Lokalzeit Ruhr), a five-minute afternoon news programme, and several radio news programmes. A local broadcasting station went on air in the late 1990s. The WAZ Media Group is one of the most important (print) media companies in Europe and publishes the Ruhr area's two most important daily newspapers, Westdeutsche Allgemeine Zeitung (WAZ; 580,000 copies) and Neue Ruhr/Rhein Zeitung (NRZ; 180,000 copies). Additionally, Axel Springer run a printing facility for their boulevard-style daily paper Bild in Essen.

Education 
One renowned educational institution in Essen is the Folkwang University, a university of the arts founded in 1927, which is headquartered in Essen and has additional facilities in Duisburg, Bochum and Dortmund. Since 1927, its traditional main location has been in the former Werden Abbey in Essen in the Ruhr area, with additional facilities in Duisburg, Bochum, and Dortmund, and, since 2010, at the Zeche Zollverein, a World Heritage Site also in Essen. The Folkwang University is home to the international dance company Folkwang Tanz Studio (FTS). In 1963 the Folkwang school was renamed Folkwang-Hochschule (Folkwang Academy). In 2010 the institution began offering graduate studies and was renamed Folkwang University of the Arts. This coincided with Ruhr.2010, the festival in which the Ruhr district was designated the European Capital of Culture for the year 2010.

The University of Duisburg-Essen, which resulted from a 2003 merger of the universities of Essen and Duisburg, is one of Germany's "youngest" universities with about 42,000 Students. One of its primary research areas is urban systems (i.e., sustainable development, logistics and transportation), a theme largely inspired by the highly urbanised Ruhr area. Other fields include nanotechnology, discrete mathematics and "education in the 21st century". Another university in Essen is the private Fachhochschule für Ökonomie und Management, a university of applied sciences with over 6,000 students and branches in 15 other major cities throughout Germany.

Medicine 
Essen offers a highly diversified health care system with more than 1,350 resident doctors and almost 6,000 beds in 13 hospitals, including a university hospital. The university hospital dates back to 1909, when the city council established a municipal hospital; although it was largely destroyed during World War II, it was later rebuilt, and finally gained the title of a university hospital in 1963. It focuses on diseases of the circulatory system (West German Heart Centre Essen), oncology and transplantation medicine, with the department of bone marrow transplantation being the second-largest of its kind in the world.

Transport

Streets and motorways 

Four Autobahnen touch Essen territory, most importantly the Ruhrschnellweg (Ruhr expressway, A 40), which runs directly through the city, dividing it roughly in half. In a west-eastern direction, the A 40 connects the Dutch city of Venlo with Dortmund, running through the whole Ruhr area. It is one of the arterial roads of the Ruhr area (> 140,000 vehicles/day) and suffers from heavy congestion during rush hours, which is why many people in the area nicknamed it Ruhrschleichweg (Ruhr crawling way). A tunnel was built in the 1970s, when the then-Bundesstraße was upgraded to motorway standards, so that the A 40 is hidden from public view in the inner-city district near the main railway station. 

In the north, the A 42 briefly touches Essen territory, serving as an interconnection between the neighboring cities of Oberhausen and Gelsenkirchen and destinations beyond.

A part of the A 44, a highly segmented connection from Aachen and the Belgian border to Kassel, planned to go further into Central Germany, ends in Essens south.

A segment of the A 52 connects Essen with the more southern region around Düsseldorf. On Essen territory, the A 52 runs from the southern boroughs near Mülheim an der Ruhr past the fairground and then merges with the Ruhrschnellweg at the Autobahndreieck Essen-Ost junction east of the city centre. 

With the A 40/A 52 in the southern parts of the city and the A 42 in the north, there is a gap in the motorway system often leading to congestion on streets leading from the central to the northern boroughs. An extension of the A 52 to connect the Essen-Ost junction with the A 42 to close this gap is considered urgent; it has been planned for years but not yet been realized – most importantly due to the high-density areas this extension would lead through, resulting in high costs and concerns with the citizens.

Public transport 
As with most communes in the Ruhr area, local transport is carried out by a local, publicly owned company for transport within the city, the DB Regio subsidiary of Deutsche Bahn for regional transport and Deutsche Bahn itself for long-distance journeys. The local carrier, Ruhrbahn, is a member of the Verkehrsverbund Rhein-Ruhr (VRR) association of public transport companies in the Ruhr area, which provides a uniform fare structure in the whole region. Within the VRR region, tickets are valid on lines of all members as well as DB's railway lines (except the high-speed InterCity and Intercity-Express networks) and can be bought at ticket machines and service centres of Ruhrbahn, all other members of VRR, and DB.

, Ruhrbahn operates 3 U-Stadtbahn lines of the Essen Stadtbahn network, 7 Straßenbahn (tram) lines and 57 bus lines (16 of these serving as Nacht Express late-night lines only). One tram line and a few bus lines coming from neighboring cities are operated by these cities' respective carriers. The U-Stadtbahn, which partly runs on used Docklands Light Railway stock, is a mixture of tram and full underground systems with 20 underground stations for the U-Stadtbahn and additional four underground stations used by the tram. Two lines of the U-Stadtbahn are completely intersection-free and hence independent from other traffic, and the U18 line leading from Mülheim main station to the Bismarckplatz station at the gates of the city centre partly runs above ground amidst the A 40 motorway. The Essen Stadtbahn is one of the Stadtbahn systems integrated into the greater Rhine-Ruhr Stadtbahn network.

On the same motorway, a long-term test of a guided bus system is being held since 1980. Many Ruhrbahn rail lines meet at the main station but only a handful of bus lines. However, all but one of the Nacht Express bus lines originate from / lead to Essen Hauptbahnhof in a star-shaped manner. All Ruhrbahn lines, including the Nacht Express lines, are closed on weekdays from 1:30 a.m. to 4:30 a.m.

Of the Rhein-Ruhr S-Bahn net's 13 lines, 5 lines lead through Essen territory and meet at the Essen Hauptbahnhof main station, which also serves as the connection to the Regional-Express and Intercity-Express network of regional and nationwide high-speed trains, respectively. Following Essen's appointment as European Capital of Culture 2010, the main station, which is classified as a station of highest importance and which had not been substantially renovated over decades, will be redeveloped with a budget of €57 million until early 2010. Further 20 S-Bahn stations can be found in the whole urban area.

In 2017 the public transport organization of Mülheim, the Mülheimer Verkehrsgesellschaft (MVG) and the Essener Verkehrsgesellschaft (EVAG) merged and became the Ruhrbahn. All vehicles and staff were merged and are now operated together.

Aviation 

Together with the neighbouring city of Mülheim an der Ruhr and the state of North Rhine-Westphalia, Essen maintains Essen/Mülheim Airport (IATA: ESS, ICAO: EDLE). While the first flights had already arrived in 1919, it was officially opened on 25 August 1925. It was heavily damaged during the war, yet partly reconstructed and used by the Allies as a secondary airport since visibility is less often obscured than at Düsseldorf Airport. The latter then developed into the large civil airport that it is now, while Essen/Mülheim now mainly serves occasional air traffic (some 33,000 passengers each year), the base of a fleet of airships and Germany's oldest public flight training company. Residents of the region around Essen typically use Düsseldorf Airport (≈20 driving minutes) and occasionally Dortmund Airport (≈30 driving minutes) for both domestic and international flights.

Landmarks

Zollverein Industrial Complex 
The Zollverein Coal Mine Industrial Complex is the city's most famous landmark. For decades, the coal mine (current form mainly from 1932, closed in 1986) and the coking plant (closed in 1993) ranked among the largest of their kinds in Europe. Shaft XII, built in Bauhaus style, with its characteristic winding tower, which over the years has become a symbol for the whole Ruhr area, is considered an architectural and technical masterpiece, earning it a reputation as the "most beautiful coal mine in the world". After UNESCO had declared it a World Heritage Site in 2001, the complex, which had lain idle for a long time and was even threatened to be demolished, began to see a period of redevelopment. Under the direction of an agency borne by the land of North Rhine-Westphalia and the city itself, several arts and design institutions settled mainly on the grounds of the former coal mine; a redevelopment plan for the coking plant is to be realised.

On the grounds of the coal mine and the coking plant, which are both accessible free of charge while paid guided tours (some with former ) are available, several tourist attractions can be found, most importantly the Design Zentrum NRW/Red Dot Design Museum. The Ruhrmuseum, a museum dedicated to the history of the Ruhr area, which had been existing since 1904, opened its gates as one of the anchor attractions in the former coal-washing facility in 2010.

Essen Minster and treasury 
The former collegiate church of Essen Abbey and nowadays cathedral of the Bishop of Essen is a Gothic hall church made from light sandstone. The first church on the premises dates back to between 845 and 870; the current church was constructed after a former church had burnt down in 1275. However, the important westwork and crypt have survived from Ottonian times. The cathedral is located in the centre of the city which evolved around it. It is not spectacular in appearance and the adjacent church St. Johann Baptist, which is located directly within the pedestrian precinct, is often mistakenly referred to as the cathedral. The cathedral treasury, however, ranks amongst the most important in Germany since only few art works have been lost over the centuries. The most precious exhibit, located within the cathedral, is the Golden Madonna of Essen (around 980), the oldest known sculpture of the Madonna and the oldest free-standing sculpture north of the Alps. Other exhibits include the alleged child crown of Emperor Otto III, the eldest preserved seven-branched Christian candelabrum and several other art works from Ottonian times.

Old Synagogue 

Opened in 1913, the then-New Synagogue served as the central meeting place of Essen's pre-war Jewish community. The building ranks as one of the largest and most impressive testimonies of Jewish culture in pre-war Germany. In post-war Germany, the former house of worship was bought by the city, used as an exhibition hall and later rededicated as a cultural meeting centre and house of Jewish culture.

Villa Hügel 
Built in 1873 by industrial magnate Alfred Krupp, Villa Hügel, the 269-room mansion and the surrounding park of  served as the Krupp family's representative seat. The city's land register solely lists the property, which at times had a staff of up to 640 people, as a single-family home. At the time of its construction, the villa featured some technical novelties and peculiarities, such as a central hot air heating system, own water- and gas works and electric internal and external telegraph- and telephone systems (with a central induction alarm for the staff). The mansion's central clock became the reference clock for the whole Krupp enterprise; every clock was to be set with a maximum difference of half a minute. It even acquired its own railway station, Essen Hügel, which is still a regular stop. The Krupp family had to leave the Gründerzeit mansion in 1945, when it was annexed by the allies. Given back in 1952, Villa Hügel is now seat of the Alfried Krupp von Bohlen und Halbach Foundation (major shareholder of Thyssen-Krupp) and was opened for concerts and sporadic yet high-profile exhibitions.

Kettwig and Werden 

In the south of the city, the boroughs of Kettwig and Werden exceptionally stand for towns once of their own, which have been annexed in 1929 (Werden) and 1975 (Kettwig), respectively, and which have largely preserved their pre-annexation character. While most of the northern boroughs were heavily damaged during the Second World War and often lost their historic town centres; the more southern parts got off more lightly.

In Werden, St. Ludger founded Werden Abbey around 799, 45 years before St. Altfrid founded the later cornerstone of the modern city, Essen Abbey. The old church of Werden abbey, St. Ludgerus, was designated a papal basilica minor in 1993, while the main building of the former abbey today is the headquarters of the Folkwang University of music and performing arts.

Kettwig, which was annexed in 1975, much to the dismay of the population that still struggles for independence, was mainly shaped by the textile industry. The most southern borough of Essen is also the city's largest (with regard to area) and presumably greenest.

Other important cultural sites 
 Museum Folkwang: One of the Ruhr area's major art collections, mainly from the 19th and 20th centuries. Major parts of the museum have recently been rebuilt and expanded according to plans by David Chipperfield & Co. The Alfried Krupp von Bohlen und Halbach Foundation is the sole funder of the €55 million project which was completed in early 2010. After its re-opening, it also hosts the collection of the Deutsches Plakat Museum (more than 340 000 exhibits).
 Aalto Theatre: Opened in 1988 (the plans dating back to 1959), the asymmetric building with its deep indigo interior is home to the acclaimed Essen Opera and Ballet.
 Saalbau Essen: Home of the Essen Philharmonic Orchestra, completely renovated in 2003/2004. Critics have repeatedly voted the Essen Philharmonic as Germany's Orchestra of the Year.
 Colosseum Theater: Situated in a former Krupp factory building at the fringe of the central pedestrian precinct, the  has been home to several musical theatre productions since 1996.
 Zeche Carl, a former coal mine, now a cultural centre and venue for Rock concerts and home of Offener Kanal Essen.
 Grillo-Theater, a theatre in the centre of the city.

Other sites 
All buildings follow the same stylistic concept, with slight variations for each one. Although originally designed as an area for the lower classes with quite small flats, the old part Margarethenhöhe I has developed into a middle class residential area and housing space has become highly sought after. A new part, Margarehenhöhe II, was built in the 1960s and 1970s but is architecturally inferior and especially the multi-storey buildings are still considered social hot spots.
Moltkeviertel (Moltke Quarter): from 1908 on, following reformative plans of the city deputy Robert Schmidt, this quarter was developed just south-east of the city centre. Large green zones, forming broad urban ventilation lanes and incorporating sporting and playing areas and high quality architecture – invariably in the style of Reform Architecture, combine to create a unique example worldwide of modern town planning. It reflects reformative ideas and dates from the early part of the 20th century. The Moltkeviertel continues to be a much sought-after area for residential, educational, health care and small-scale commercial purposes. On the Moltkeplatz, the quarter's largest square, an ensemble of high quality contemporary art is maintained and cared for by local residents.
It includes the city's botanical garden, the Botanischer Garten Grugapark.
: The largest of the six reservoirs of the River Ruhr, situated in the south of the city, is another popular recreational area. It is used for sailing, rowing and ship tours. The hilly and only lightly developed forest area around the lake, from which the Kettwig area is easily reachable, is popular with hikers.

Notable people

Natives
People born in Essen:

Gerd Albrecht (1935-2014), conductor
Karl Albrecht (1920-2014), entrepreneur 
Theo Albrecht (1922-2010), entrepreneur; brother of Karl
Peter Anders (1908-1954), operatic tenor
Karl Baedeker (1801-1859), publisher
Jürgen Bartsch (1946-1976), serial killer
Ute Berg (born 1953), politician
Naftali Bezem (1924-2018), artist
Ali Bilgin (born 1981), footballer
Franz Blücher (1896-1959), politician
Hermann Blumenthal (1905-1942), sculptor
Karl Brandt (1899-1975), agricultural economist
Sabine Braun (born 1965), track athlete
Dennis Brinkmann (born 1978), footballer
Ernest B.H. Busch (1885-1945), Generalfeldmarschall
Gunter d'Alquen (1910-1998), editor
Marc Degens (born 1971), writer
Marius Ebbers (born 1978), footballer
Friedrich Karl Florian (1894-1975), gauleiter
James Ingo Freed (1930-2005), architect
Matt Frei (born 1963), journalist
Harald Grohs (born 1944), race car driver
Brigitte Hamann (1940-2016), author
Hildegard Hamm-Brücher (1921-2016), politician
Walter Heiman (1901-2007), centenarian and WW1 survivor
Alfred Herrhausen (1930-1989), banker
Axel Honneth (born 1949), philosopher
Carl Humann (1839-1896), engineer
Wilhelm Kalveram (1882-1951), university professor
Christian Keller (born 1972), swimmer
Fritz G. A. Kraemer (1908-2003), military educator
Diether Krebs (1947-2000), actor
Helene Kröller-Müller (1869-1939), art collector
Alfred Krupp (1812-1887), inventor
Alfried Krupp von Bohlen und Halbach (1907-1967), Nazi industrialist
Bertha Krupp (1886-1957), daughter of Friedrich Alfred
Friedrich Alfred Krupp (1854-1902), steel manufacturer
Friedrich C. Krupp (1787-1826), founder of Krupp family business
Heinz Kubsch (1930-1993), football goalkeeper
Hubert Lampo (1920-2006), writer
Johanna Langefeld (1900-1974), Nazi guard
Arthur Laumann (1894-1970), flying ace
Issachar Berend Lehmann (1661-1730), banker
Jens Lehmann (born 1969), footballer
Helga Niessen Masthoff (born 1941), tennis player
Armin Meiwes (born 1961), convicted murderer known as the Cannibal of Rothenburg
Frank Mill (born 1958), footballer
Harry S. Morgan (1945-2011), pornographic film director
Alfred Müller-Armack (1901-1978), politician
Henry Osterman (1862-????), architect
Friedrich Panse (1899-1973), psychiatrist
Mille Petrozza (born 1967), guitarist
Helmut Rahn (1929-2003), footballer
Uta Ranke-Heinemann (1927-2021), theologian 
Otto Rehhagel (born 1938), footballer
Uwe Reinders (born 1955), footballer
Günther Rennert (1911-1978), opera director
Heinz Rühmann (1902-1994), actor
Klaus Scharioth (born 1946), diplomat
Magdalene Schauss-Flake (1921-2008), composer and organist
Hilde Krahwinkel Sperling (1908-1981), tennis player
John Steppling (1870-1932), actor
David D. Stern (born 1956), artist
Martin Stratmann (born 1954), electrochemist
Marianne Strauss (1923-1996), Holocaust survivor
Josef Terboven (1898-1945), Nazi politician
Bernhard Termath (1928-2004), footballer
Johan van Galen (1604-1653), commodore
Kyriakos Velopoulos (born 1965), politician
Albert Vögler (1877-1945), politician
Elisabeth Volkmann (1936-2006), actress
Pia Walkenhorst (born 1993), volleyball player
Daniel Wende (born 1984), skater

Honorary citizens 
The city of Essen has been awarding honorary citizenships since 1879 but has (coincidentally) discontinued this tradition after the foundation of the Federal Republic of Germany in 1949. A notable exception was made in 2007, when Berthold Beitz, the president of the Alfried Krupp von Bohlen und Halbach Foundation received honorary citizenship for his long lasting commitment to the city.
The following list contains all honorary citizens of the city of Essen:
1879 Otto von BismarckChancellor of Germany
1888 politician, lawyer and economist
1895 Roman catholic theologian
1896 Friedrich Alfred Kruppindustrialist (spouse of Margarethe Krupp, see below)
1901 Heinrich Carl Söllingtradesman and benefactor
1906 Lord Mayor (1886–1906)
1912 benefactress (spouse of Friedrich Alfred Krupp, see above)
1917 Paul von HindenburgGeneralfeldmarschall and army leader, later President of Germany
1949 Viktor Niemeyercouncilman (posthumous recognition)
2007 Berthold Beitzpresident of the Alfried Krupp von Bohlen und Halbach Foundation
Today, the highest award of the city is the Ring of Honour, which Berthold Beitz, for example, had already received in 1983. Other bearers of the Ring of Honour include Essen's former Lord Mayor and later President of Germany, Gustav Heinemann, as well as Franz Cardinal Hengsbach, the first Bishop of Essen.

Sport 

The biggest association football clubs in Essen are Rot-Weiss Essen (Red-White Essen) and Schwarz-Weiß Essen (Black-White Essen). Stadion Essen, is the home stadium for Rot-Weiß, is located in the north of Essen. Rot-Weiss Essen is playing in the third tier of the German football league system, 3. Liga, and Schwarz-Weiß Essen in the fifth tier, Oberliga Nordrhein-Westfalen. Schwarz-Weiß Essens home stadium is Uhlenkrugstadion, located in the southern part of the city. Other football clubs are BV Altenessen and TuS Helene Altenessen. In women's football, SGS Essen are members of top division Frauen-Bundesliga.

Another important and famous sports club is TUSEM Essen, with a handball team that have won several national and international titles.

The city's main basketball team is ETB Essen, currently called the ETB Wohnbau Baskets for sponsorship reasons. The team is one of the main teams in Germany's second division ProA and has attempted to move up to Germany's elite league Basketball Bundesliga. The Baskets play their home games at the Sportpark am Hallo.

Essen hosted the 1955 nine-pin bowling World Championships and the final round of the FIBA EuroBasket 1971. The city is also home to the VV Humann Essen volleyball team.

References

Bibliography

External links 

 
 Essen city panoramas, panoramic views and virtual tours
 Pictures from Kettwig
 Memorials in Essen, sites-of-memory.de

 
Districts of the Rhine Province